David William Baker (26 July 1935 – 26 December 2021) was an English professional cricketer who played first-class cricket between 1961 and 1965 for Kent and Nottinghamshire County Cricket Clubs.

Baker was born at Kingston upon Hull in 1935 but was educated at Bermondsey in London. He was a legbreak and googly bowler who played in 34 first-class matches in his career.

After National Service in the Royal Air Force, Baker signed for Kent in 1959 and was awarded his Second XI cap in 1960. He made his senior debut for the side in 1961. Baker played 27 times for Kent between 1961 and the end of the 1963 season before moving to Nottinghamshire. He played seven times in two seasons for Notts before being released by the club. He continued to play club cricket and ran a public house at Bramcote in Nottinghamshire.

Baker died at Beeston in Nottinghamshire in December 2021 after a long illness. He was aged 86.

References

External links

1935 births
2021 deaths
English cricketers
Kent cricketers
Nottinghamshire cricketers
Cricketers from Kingston upon Hull